Broxton Creek is a stream in the U.S. state of Georgia. It is a tributary to the Seventeen Mile River.

Broxton Creek most likely was named after Henry Broxton, a pioneer citizen. A variant name is "Braxton Creek".

References

Rivers of Georgia (U.S. state)
Rivers of Coffee County, Georgia